Cheshmeh Jiuri Montangun (also Romanized as Cheshmeh Jīūrī Montangūn; also known as Cheshmeh Jeverl and Cheshmeh Jūrī) is a village in Ludab Rural District, Ludab District, Boyer-Ahmad County, Kohgiluyeh and Boyer-Ahmad Province, Iran. At the 2006 census, its population was 165, in 26 families.

References 

Populated places in Boyer-Ahmad County